Drift ice, also called brash ice, is sea ice that is not attached to the shoreline or any other fixed object (shoals, grounded icebergs, etc.). Unlike fast ice, which is "fastened" to a fixed object, drift ice is carried along by winds and sea currents, hence its name. When drift ice is driven together into a large single mass (>70% coverage), it is called pack ice. Wind and currents can pile up that ice to form ridges up to dozens of metres in thickness. These represent a challenge for icebreakers and offshore structures operating in cold oceans and seas.

Drift ice consists of ice floes, individual pieces of sea ice  or more across.

Drift ice affects:
 Security of navigation
 Climatic impact (see Polar ice packs)
 Geological impact
 Biosphere influence (see Ecology of sea ice)

Drift ice can exert tremendous forces when rammed against structures, and can shear off rudders and propellers from ships and strong structures anchored to the shore, such as piers. These structures must be retractable or removable to avoid damage. Similarly, ships can get stuck between drift ice floes.

The two major ice packs are the Arctic ice pack and the Antarctic ice pack. The most important areas of pack ice are the polar ice packs formed from seawater in the Earth's polar regions: the Arctic ice pack of the Arctic Ocean and the Antarctic ice pack of the Southern Ocean. Polar packs significantly change their size during seasonal changes of the year. Because of vast amounts of water added to or removed from the oceans and atmosphere, the behavior of polar ice packs has a significant impact on global changes in climate.

Seasonal ice drift in the Sea of Okhotsk by the northern coast of Hokkaidō, Japan, has become a tourist attraction, and is one of the 100 Soundscapes of Japan. The Sea of Okhotsk is the southernmost area in the Northern Hemisphere where drift ice may be observed.

See also

References

External links 
 "Ice in the Sea" : chapter from Nathaniel Bowditch's American Practical Navigator
 Cryosphere Today : Current Arctic sea ice conditions 
 Data source for sea ice picture
 Marine Modeling and Analysis Branch 
 Everything you ever wanted to know about sea ice but were afraid to ask
 Animation of the movement of sea ice, September 2003 through May 2004
 Atlas of Antarctic Sea Ice Drift
 The Papers of Paul Gordienko on Ice and Ice Drifts at Dartmouth College Library

Sea ice
Oceanography